Gysin may refer to:
Brion Gysin (1916–1986), English painter, writer, sound poet, and performance artist
Werner Gysin (1915–1998), Swiss mathematician
Gysin homomorphism
Gysin sequence

See also
 Gisin (disambiguation)